Rimavská Sobota is a town in southern Slovakia, in the Banská Bystrica Region, on the Rimava river. It has approximately 24,000 inhabitants. The town is a historical capital of Gömör és Kishont County (from 1850 to 1922).

Geography
The town, along with the district lies in the Rimava river valley in the Slovenské rudohorie mountains, in the Southern Slovak Basin. There are two protected areas close to the town in the district, Cerová vrchovina to the south and Muránska planina National Park to the north.

The town is composed of 11 parts/boroughs: Bakta, Dúžava, Kurinec, Mojín, Nižná Pokoradz, Rimavská Sobota, Sabová, Sobôtka, Včelinec, Vinice and Vyšná Pokoradz.

History
The first traces of settlement in the town's territory come from the Neolithic. Other archaeological discoveries are dated to the middle and late Bronze Age and Iron Age. Several tribes have passed through the area, including Celts, Germanic tribes and several others during the Migration Period. The Slavs settled here most likely in the 7th and 8th centuries. The old Hungarian tribes came at the beginning of the 10th century and settled in the 11th century. A medieval town was probably founded in the second half of the 11th century and became a market town.

The first written record about Rimavská Sobota was in 1268 as Rymoa Zumbota and belonged to the Archbishop of Kalocsa, who owned the land from 1150 to around 1340. In 1334 the ownership changed to Thomas Szécsényi from Transylvania. The town received a privilege charted in 1335 on the basis of the Buda municipal law. In the first half of the 15th century, it was a small town, and economic development had begun, when the first guilds were established. However, it was interrupted by Turkish occupation, first in 1553–1593 and then in 1596–1686. It was centre of Filek sanjak firstly in Budin Eyalet, latterly Eğri Eyalet. The town was growing again in the 18th century, with the guilds of tanners, weavers, shoe-makers and others being set up. It became a free privileged town in the 1790s. From 1850 to 1922 it was the capital of the Gömör-Kishont county. Industry started to develop in the 20th century, with a cannery being established.

After the break-up of Austria-Hungary, the town was occupied by the Czechoslovak Legions in January 1919. However, the army of the Hungarian Soviet Republic came to the town in May 1919, but control reverted to Czechoslovakia in July 1919. After the First Vienna Award in 1938, the town belonged to Hungary to the end of 1944. During the Socialist Czechoslovakia, food industry developed here; for example, a sugar factory was established in 1966 and a meat processing plant in 1977.

Economy
The town's main trade is agriculture and food processing. Agricultural production is aimed at animal production: beef-raising, sheep farming, and farming of permanent grass fields, meadows and pasture lands. Rimavská's hollow basin is an important agricultural area, where almost all crops can be grown, including the more thermophilic ones, such as sugar beet, wheat, rye, vegetable, tobacco, vine, lucerne, and corn. Forest resources are under both state and private administration.  The town also has electrotechnical, mechanical, and chemical businesses.  All industrial companies were privatized during the Slovak economy transformation.

The most important transport line goes through the southern part of the county. The district is also the site of former Czechoslovakia (now Radio Slovakia International, RSI) shortwave radio antenna tower facility, using a 250 kW transmitter to reach listening audiences as far away as North America. The towers and masts of the station have heights up to 171 metres.

Rimavská Sobota's tourist industry is as yet largely undeveloped, due to a lack of infrastructure, although the area possesses natural, historical, and cultural potential.

Demographics
In 1910, 90% of the population was Hungarian, Slovaks made up the most significant ethnic minority with 7%. According to the 2001 census, there were 25,088 people living in the town, the majority being Slovaks (59.28%), with a significant minority of Hungarians (35.26%), a small percentage of Roma (3.01%) and others. The religious make-up was: 47.84% Roman Catholics, 25.44% without denomination, 10.33 Protestants and 5.26% not specified.

Twin towns — sister cities

Rimavská Sobota is twinned with:
 Kolín, Czech Republic
 Ózd, Hungary
 Tiszaújváros, Hungary
 Salonta, Romania
 Świętochłowice, Poland

See also
 List of cultural monuments in Rimavská Sobota

References

External links
 
  
 Official website
 Webcamera and useful info 

Cities and towns in Slovakia
Hungarian communities in Slovakia